The 2003 Conference USA men's soccer tournament was the ninth edition of the Conference USA Men's Soccer Tournament. The tournament decided the Conference USA champion and guaranteed representative into the 2003 NCAA Division I Men's Soccer Championship. The tournament was hosted by the University of Memphis and the games were played at the Mike Rose Soccer Complex.

Bracket

Awards

All-Tournament team
Floyd Franks, Charlotte
Joe Lampert, Charlotte
Lucas Macknos, Charlotte
Tim Brown, Cincinnati
Josh Gardner, Cincinnati
Nick Gannon, Saint Louis
Martin Hutton, Saint Louis
Vedad Ibišević, Saint Louis
Andy Pusateri, Saint Louis
Leandro de Oliveira, UAB
Jason McLaughlin, UAB

References

External links
 

Conference USA Men's Soccer Tournament
Tournament
Conference USA Men's Soccer Tournament
Conference USA Men's Soccer Tournament